Cian Melia is an Irish showjumper. A native of Claregalway, he has participated in the Galway County Show, where he and his horse, Bungowla Pressure, won the Riverview class. Along with Michael Duffy and Kate MacDonagh he has represented Ireland in the National Grand Prix league. At the August 2010 Ballinasloe Horse Show, he and Bungowla Pressure came first in the 1.20 class in the main sand arena. He also won the Puissance class, clearing the big wall at 1.95m. He won the Leading Rider Prize.

References

Sportspeople from County Galway
Living people
Place of birth missing (living people)
Year of birth missing (living people)